Fissler is a company based in Germany that produces cookware items.  Fissler’s main products include pots, pans, and pressure cookers, knives, and kitchen accessories.

Fissler’s history dates back to the 19th century with its introduction of the Goulash Cannon, a mobile field kitchen. In the 1920s Fissler came out with the first aluminum pans for electric stoves.  In the 1950s Fissler introduced the first pressure cooker with a multi-setting control valve and the patented "Thematic" base. 

Today, Fissler’s pots and pans have an all-stove base, meaning that they can be used on any heating surface without warping or degrading. Fissler also produces the CookStar Induction Pro, an induction cooking surface. Induction cooking uses electromagnetic technology to heat the pots and pans, without being hot to the touch. 

The company at one time produced the world's most expensive pan costing £100,000.

Fissler’s two lines of knives are called Profession and Perfection. The Profession line is inspired by Japanese knives and includes knives specific for making sushi. The Perfection knives are stylish and modern.

References

External links

Manufacturing companies of Germany
Companies based in Rhineland-Palatinate
Companies established in 1845
German brands